The following is a list of association football venues in the Republic of Ireland, ranked in descending order of capacity.

Note that the Brandywell Stadium is not included; though Derry City F.C. play in the League of Ireland, they are located in Northern Ireland. See List of association football stadiums in Northern Ireland.

Stadiums

Proposed stadiums and redevelopments

Redevelopments of current stadiums are in italics.

References

See also 
List of stadiums in Ireland
List of Gaelic Athletic Association stadiums
List of association football stadiums by capacity
List of European stadiums by capacity

 
Ireland
Football stadiums in the Republic of Ireland
venues